Balatopar is a village in Almaty Region of south-eastern Kazakhstan. It is the administrative center of the Balatopar rural district (KATO code - 193659100). Population:

Geography

References

External links
Tageo.com

Populated places in Almaty Region

ru:Балатопар